Li Fei (born 1983-03-22 in Qingdao, Shandong) is a male Chinese sports sailor who will compete for Team China at the 2008 Summer Olympics.

Major performances

2005 Asian Championships - 7th 470 class;
2005 National Championships - 1st 49er class

References
 http://2008teamchina.olympic.cn/index.php/personview/personsen/5134

1983 births
Living people
Chinese male sailors (sport)
Olympic sailors of China
Sportspeople from Qingdao
Sailors at the 2008 Summer Olympics – 49er